Paper Castles may refer to:
 Paper Castles (album), a 2019 album by Alice Phoebe Lou
 Paper Castles (film), a 2009 Spanish romantic drama film